Thallium (81Tl) has 41 isotopes with atomic masses that range from 176 to 216. 203Tl and 205Tl are the only stable isotopes and 204Tl is the most stable radioisotope with a half-life of 3.78 years. 207Tl, with a half-life of 4.77 minutes, has the longest half-life of naturally occurring Tl radioisotopes. All isotopes of thallium are either radioactive or observationally stable, meaning that they are predicted to be radioactive but no actual decay has been observed.

Thallium-202 (half-life 12.23 days) can be made in a cyclotron while thallium-204 (half-life 3.78 years) is made by the neutron activation of stable thallium in a nuclear reactor.

In the fully ionized state, the isotope 205Tl becomes beta-radioactive, decaying to 205Pb, but 203Tl remains stable.

205Tl is the decay product of bismuth-209, an isotope that was once thought to be stable but is now known to undergo alpha decay with an extremely long half life of 2.01×1019 y. 205Tl is at the end of the neptunium series decay chain.

List of isotopes 

|-
| 176Tl
|
| style="text-align:right" | 81
| style="text-align:right" | 95
| 176.00059(21)#
| 5.2(+30−14) ms
|
|
| (3−, 4−, 5−)
|
|
|-
| rowspan=2|177Tl
| rowspan=2|
| rowspan=2 style="text-align:right" | 81
| rowspan=2 style="text-align:right" | 96
| rowspan=2|176.996427(27)
| rowspan=2|18(5) ms
| p
| 176Hg
| rowspan=2|(1/2+)
| rowspan=2|
| rowspan=2|
|-
| α (rare)
| 173Au
|-
| rowspan=2 style="text-indent:1em" | 177mTl
| rowspan=2|
| rowspan=2 colspan="3" style="text-indent:2em" | 807(18) keV
| rowspan=2|230(40) μs
| p
| 176Hg
| rowspan=2|(11/2−)
| rowspan=2|
| rowspan=2|
|-
| α
| 173Au
|-
| rowspan=2|178Tl
| rowspan=2|
| rowspan=2 style="text-align:right" | 81
| rowspan=2 style="text-align:right" | 97
| rowspan=2|177.99490(12)#
| rowspan=2|255(10) ms
| α
| 174Au
| rowspan=2|
| rowspan=2|
| rowspan=2|
|-
| p (rare)
| 177Hg
|-
| rowspan=2|179Tl
| rowspan=2|
| rowspan=2 style="text-align:right" | 81
| rowspan=2 style="text-align:right" | 98
| rowspan=2|178.99109(5)
| rowspan=2|270(30) ms
| α
| 175Au
| rowspan=2|(1/2+)
| rowspan=2|
| rowspan=2|
|-
| p (rare)
| 178Hg
|-
| rowspan=2 style="text-indent:1em" | 179mTl
| rowspan=2|
| rowspan=2 colspan="3" style="text-indent:2em" | 860(30)# keV
| rowspan=2|1.60(16) ms
| α
| 175Au
| rowspan=2|(9/2−)
| rowspan=2|
| rowspan=2|
|-
| IT (rare)
| 179Tl
|-
| rowspan=3|180Tl
| rowspan=3|
| rowspan=3 style="text-align:right" | 81
| rowspan=3 style="text-align:right" | 99
| rowspan=3|179.98991(13)#
| rowspan=3|1.5(2) s
| α (75%)
| 176Au
| rowspan=3|
| rowspan=3|
| rowspan=3|
|-
| β+ (25%)
| 180Hg
|-
| EC, fission (10−4%)
| 100Ru, 80Kr
|-
| rowspan=2|181Tl
| rowspan=2|
| rowspan=2 style="text-align:right" | 81
| rowspan=2 style="text-align:right" | 100
| rowspan=2|180.986257(10)
| rowspan=2|3.2(3) s
| α
| 177Au
| rowspan=2|1/2+#
| rowspan=2|
| rowspan=2|
|-
| β+
| 181Hg
|-
| rowspan=2 style="text-indent:1em" | 181mTl
| rowspan=2|
| rowspan=2 colspan="3" style="text-indent:2em" | 857(29) keV
| rowspan=2|1.7(4) ms
| α
| 177Au
| rowspan=2|9/2−#
| rowspan=2|
| rowspan=2|
|-
| β+
| 181Hg
|-
| rowspan=2|182Tl
| rowspan=2|
| rowspan=2 style="text-align:right" | 81
| rowspan=2 style="text-align:right" | 101
| rowspan=2|181.98567(8)
| rowspan=2|2.0(3) s
| β+ (96%)
| 182Hg
| rowspan=2|2−#
| rowspan=2|
| rowspan=2|
|-
| α (4%)
| 178Au
|-
| rowspan=2 style="text-indent:1em" | 182m1Tl
| rowspan=2|
| rowspan=2 colspan="3" style="text-indent:2em" | 100(100)# keV
| rowspan=2|2.9(5) s
| α
| 178Au
| rowspan=2|(7+)
| rowspan=2|
| rowspan=2|
|-
| β+ (rare)
| 182Hg
|-
| style="text-indent:1em" | 182m2Tl
|
| colspan="3" style="text-indent:2em" | 600(140)# keV
|
|
|
| 10−
|
|
|-
| rowspan=2|183Tl
| rowspan=2|
| rowspan=2 style="text-align:right" | 81
| rowspan=2 style="text-align:right" | 102
| rowspan=2|182.982193(10)
| rowspan=2|6.9(7) s
| β+ (98%)
| 183Hg
| rowspan=2|1/2+#
| rowspan=2|
| rowspan=2|
|-
| α (2%)
| 179Au
|-
| rowspan=2 style="text-indent:1em" | 183m1Tl
| rowspan=2|
| rowspan=2 colspan="3" style="text-indent:2em" | 630(17) keV
| rowspan=2|53.3(3) ms
| IT (99.99%)
| 183Tl
| rowspan=2|9/2−#
| rowspan=2|
| rowspan=2|
|-
| α (.01%)
| 179Au
|-
| style="text-indent:1em" | 183m2Tl
|
| colspan="3" style="text-indent:2em" | 976.8(3) keV
| 1.48(10) μs
|
|
| (13/2+)
|
|
|-
| 184Tl
|
| style="text-align:right" | 81
| style="text-align:right" | 103
| 183.98187(5)
| 9.7(6) s
| β+
| 184Hg
| 2−#
|
|
|-
| rowspan=2 style="text-indent:1em" | 184m1Tl
| rowspan=2|
| rowspan=2 colspan="3" style="text-indent:2em" | 100(100)# keV
| rowspan=2|10# s
| β+ (97.9%)
| 184Hg
| rowspan=2|7+#
| rowspan=2|
| rowspan=2|
|-
| α (2.1%)
| 180Au
|-
| rowspan=2 style="text-indent:1em" | 184m2Tl
| rowspan=2|
| rowspan=2 colspan="3" style="text-indent:2em" | 500(140)# keV
| rowspan=2| 47.1 ms
| IT (99.911%)
|
| rowspan=2|(10−)
| rowspan=2|
| rowspan=2|
|-
| α (.089%)
| 180Au
|-
| rowspan=2|185Tl
| rowspan=2|
| rowspan=2 style="text-align:right" | 81
| rowspan=2 style="text-align:right" | 104
| rowspan=2|184.97879(6)
| rowspan=2|19.5(5) s
| α
| 181Au
| rowspan=2|1/2+#
| rowspan=2|
| rowspan=2|
|-
| β+
| 185Hg
|-
| rowspan=3 style="text-indent:1em" | 185mTl
| rowspan=3|
| rowspan=3 colspan="3" style="text-indent:2em" | 452.8(20) keV
| rowspan=3|1.93(8) s
| IT (99.99%)
| 185Tl
| rowspan=3|9/2−#
| rowspan=3|
| rowspan=3|
|-
| α (.01%)
| 181Au
|-
| β+
| 185Hg
|-
| rowspan=2|186Tl
| rowspan=2|
| rowspan=2 style="text-align:right" | 81
| rowspan=2 style="text-align:right" | 105
| rowspan=2|185.97833(20)
| rowspan=2|40# s
| β+
| 186Hg
| rowspan=2|(2−)
| rowspan=2|
| rowspan=2|
|-
| α (.006%)
| 182Au
|-
| style="text-indent:1em" | 186m1Tl
|
| colspan="3" style="text-indent:2em" | 320(180) keV
| 27.5(10) s
| β+
| 186Hg
| (7+)
|
|
|-
| style="text-indent:1em" | 186m2Tl
|
| colspan="3" style="text-indent:2em" | 690(180) keV
| 2.9(2) s
|
|
| (10−)
|
|
|-
| rowspan=2|187Tl
| rowspan=2|
| rowspan=2 style="text-align:right" | 81
| rowspan=2 style="text-align:right" | 106
| rowspan=2|186.975906(9)
| rowspan=2|~51 s
| β+
| 187Hg
| rowspan=2|(1/2+)
| rowspan=2|
| rowspan=2|
|-
| α (rare)
| 183Au
|-
| rowspan=3 style="text-indent:1em" | 187mTl
| rowspan=3|
| rowspan=3 colspan="3" style="text-indent:2em" | 335(3) keV
| rowspan=3|15.60(12) s
| α
| 183Au
| rowspan=3|(9/2−)
| rowspan=3|
| rowspan=3|
|-
| IT
| 187Tl
|-
| β+
| 187Hg
|-
| 188Tl
|
| style="text-align:right" | 81
| style="text-align:right" | 107
| 187.97601(4)
| 71(2) s
| β+
| 188Hg
| (2−)
|
|
|-
| style="text-indent:1em" | 188m1Tl
|
| colspan="3" style="text-indent:2em" | 40(30) keV
| 71(1) s
| β+
| 188Hg
| (7+)
|
|
|-
| style="text-indent:1em" | 188m2Tl
|
| colspan="3" style="text-indent:2em" | 310(30) keV
| 41(4) ms
|
|
| (9−)
|
|
|-
| 189Tl
|
| style="text-align:right" | 81
| style="text-align:right" | 108
| 188.973588(12)
| 2.3(2) min
| β+
| 189Hg
| (1/2+)
|
|
|-
| rowspan=2 style="text-indent:1em" | 189mTl
| rowspan=2|
| rowspan=2 colspan="3" style="text-indent:2em" | 257.6(13) keV
| rowspan=2|1.4(1) min
| β+ (96%)
| 189Hg
| rowspan=2|(9/2−)
| rowspan=2|
| rowspan=2|
|-
| IT (4%)
| 189Tl
|-
| 190Tl
|
| style="text-align:right" | 81
| style="text-align:right" | 109
| 189.97388(5)
| 2.6(3) min
| β+
| 190Hg
| 2(−)
|
|
|-
| style="text-indent:1em" | 190m1Tl
|
| colspan="3" style="text-indent:2em" | 130(90)# keV
| 3.7(3) min
| β+
| 190Hg
| 7(+#)
|
|
|-
| style="text-indent:1em" | 190m2Tl
|
| colspan="3" style="text-indent:2em" | 290(70)# keV
| 750(40) μs
|
|
| (8−)
|
|
|-
| style="text-indent:1em" | 190m3Tl
|
| colspan="3" style="text-indent:2em" | 410(70)# keV
| >1 μs
|
|
| 9−
|
|
|-
| 191Tl
|
| style="text-align:right" | 81
| style="text-align:right" | 110
| 190.971786(8)
| 20# min
| β+
| 191Hg
| (1/2+)
|
|
|-
| style="text-indent:1em" | 191mTl
|
| colspan="3" style="text-indent:2em" | 297(7) keV
| 5.22(16) min
| β+
| 191Hg
| 9/2(−)
|
|
|-
| 192Tl
|
| style="text-align:right" | 81
| style="text-align:right" | 111
| 191.97223(3)
| 9.6(4) min
| β+
| 192Hg
| (2−)
|
|
|-
| style="text-indent:1em" | 192m1Tl
|
| colspan="3" style="text-indent:2em" | 160(50) keV
| 10.8(2) min
| β+
| 192Hg
| (7+)
|
|
|-
| style="text-indent:1em" | 192m2Tl
|
| colspan="3" style="text-indent:2em" | 407(54) keV
| 296(5) ns
|
|
| (8−)
|
|
|-
| 193Tl
|
| style="text-align:right" | 81
| style="text-align:right" | 112
| 192.97067(12)
| 21.6(8) min
| β+
| 193Hg
| 1/2(+#)
|
|
|-
| rowspan=2 style="text-indent:1em" | 193mTl
| rowspan=2|
| rowspan=2 colspan="3" style="text-indent:2em" | 369(4) keV
| rowspan=2|2.11(15) min
| IT (75%)
| 193Tl
| rowspan=2|9/2−
| rowspan=2|
| rowspan=2|
|-
| β+ (25%)
| 193Hg
|-
| rowspan=2|194Tl
| rowspan=2|
| rowspan=2 style="text-align:right" | 81
| rowspan=2 style="text-align:right" | 113
| rowspan=2|193.97120(15)
| rowspan=2|33.0(5) min
| β+
| 194Hg
| rowspan=2|2−
| rowspan=2|
| rowspan=2|
|-
| α (10−7%)
| 190Au
|-
| style="text-indent:1em" | 194mTl
|
| colspan="3" style="text-indent:2em" | 300(200)# keV
| 32.8(2) min
| β+
| 194Hg
| (7+)
|
|
|-
| 195Tl
|
| style="text-align:right" | 81
| style="text-align:right" | 114
| 194.969774(15)
| 1.16(5) h
| β+
| 195Hg
| 1/2+
|
|
|-
| style="text-indent:1em" | 195mTl
|
| colspan="3" style="text-indent:2em" | 482.63(17) keV
| 3.6(4) s
| IT
| 195Tl
| 9/2−
|
|
|-
| 196Tl
|
| style="text-align:right" | 81
| style="text-align:right" | 115
| 195.970481(13)
| 1.84(3) h
| β+
| 196Hg
| 2−
|
|
|-
| rowspan=2 style="text-indent:1em" | 196mTl
| rowspan=2|
| rowspan=2 colspan="3" style="text-indent:2em" | 394.2(5) keV
| rowspan=2|1.41(2) h
| β+ (95.5%)
| 196Hg
| rowspan=2|(7+)
| rowspan=2|
| rowspan=2|
|-
| IT (4.5%)
| 196Tl
|-
| 197Tl
|
| style="text-align:right" | 81
| style="text-align:right" | 116
| 196.969575(18)
| 2.84(4) h
| β+
| 197Hg
| 1/2+
|
|
|-
| style="text-indent:1em" | 197mTl
|
| colspan="3" style="text-indent:2em" | 608.22(8) keV
| 540(10) ms
| IT
| 197Tl
| 9/2−
|
|
|-
| 198Tl
|
| style="text-align:right" | 81
| style="text-align:right" | 117
| 197.97048(9)
| 5.3(5) h
| β+
| 198Hg
| 2−
|
|
|-
| rowspan=2 style="text-indent:1em" | 198m1Tl
| rowspan=2|
| rowspan=2 colspan="3" style="text-indent:2em" | 543.5(4) keV
| rowspan=2|1.87(3) h
| β+ (54%)
| 198Hg
| rowspan=2|7+
| rowspan=2|
| rowspan=2|
|-
| IT (46%)
| 198Tl
|-
| style="text-indent:1em" | 198m2Tl
|
| colspan="3" style="text-indent:2em" | 687.2(5) keV
| 150(40) ns
|
|
| (5+)
|
|
|-
| style="text-indent:1em" | 198m3Tl
|
| colspan="3" style="text-indent:2em" | 742.3(4) keV
| 32.1(10) ms
|
|
| (10−)#
|
|
|-
| 199Tl
|
| style="text-align:right" | 81
| style="text-align:right" | 118
| 198.96988(3)
| 7.42(8) h
| β+
| 199Hg
| 1/2+
|
|
|-
| style="text-indent:1em" | 199mTl
|
| colspan="3" style="text-indent:2em" | 749.7(3) keV
| 28.4(2) ms
| IT
| 199Tl
| 9/2−
|
|
|-
| 200Tl
|
| style="text-align:right" | 81
| style="text-align:right" | 119
| 199.970963(6)
| 26.1(1) h
| β+
| 200Hg
| 2−
|
|
|-
| style="text-indent:1em" | 200m1Tl
|
| colspan="3" style="text-indent:2em" | 753.6(2) keV
| 34.3(10) ms
| IT
| 200Tl
| 7+
|
|
|-
| style="text-indent:1em" | 200m2Tl
|
| colspan="3" style="text-indent:2em" | 762.0(2) keV
| 0.33(5) μs
|
|
| 5+
|
|
|-
| 201Tl
|
| style="text-align:right" | 81
| style="text-align:right" | 120
| 200.970819(16)
| 72.912(17) h
| EC
| 201Hg
| 1/2+
|
|
|-
| style="text-indent:1em" | 201mTl
|
| colspan="3" style="text-indent:2em" | 919.50(9) keV
| 2.035(7) ms
| IT
| 201Tl
| (9/2−)
|
|
|-
| 202Tl
|
| style="text-align:right" | 81
| style="text-align:right" | 121
| 201.972106(16)
| 12.23(2) d
| β+
| 202Hg
| 2−
|
|
|-
| style="text-indent:1em" | 202mTl
|
| colspan="3" style="text-indent:2em" | 950.19(10) keV
| 572(7) μs
|
|
| 7+
|
|
|-
| 203Tl
|
| style="text-align:right" | 81
| style="text-align:right" | 122
| 202.9723442(14)
| colspan=3 align=center|Observationally Stable
| 1/2+
| 0.2952(1)
| 0.29494–0.29528
|-
| style="text-indent:1em" | 203mTl
|
| colspan="3" style="text-indent:2em" | 3400(300) keV
| 7.7(5) μs
|
|
| (25/2+)
|
|
|-
| rowspan=2|204Tl
| rowspan=2|
| rowspan=2 style="text-align:right" | 81
| rowspan=2 style="text-align:right" | 123
| rowspan=2|203.9738635(13)
| rowspan=2|3.78(2) y
| β− (97.1%)
| 204Pb
| rowspan=2|2−
| rowspan=2|
| rowspan=2|
|-
| EC (2.9%)
| 204Hg
|-
| style="text-indent:1em" | 204m1Tl
|
| colspan="3" style="text-indent:2em" | 1104.0(4) keV
| 63(2) μs
|
|
| (7)+
|
|
|-
| style="text-indent:1em" | 204m2Tl
|
| colspan="3" style="text-indent:2em" | 2500(500) keV
| 2.6(2) μs
|
|
| (12−)
|
|
|-
| style="text-indent:1em" | 204m3Tl
|
| colspan="3" style="text-indent:2em" | 3500(500) keV
| 1.6(2) μs
|
|
| (20+)
|
|
|-
| 205Tl
|
| style="text-align:right" | 81
| style="text-align:right" | 124
| 204.9744275(14)
| colspan=3 align=center|Observationally Stable
| 1/2+
| 0.7048(1)
| 0.70472–0.70506
|-
| style="text-indent:1em" | 205m1Tl
|
| colspan="3" style="text-indent:2em" | 3290.63(17) keV
| 2.6(2) μs
|
|
| 25/2+
|
|
|-
| style="text-indent:1em" | 205m2Tl
|
| colspan="3" style="text-indent:2em" | 4835.6(15) keV
| 235(10) ns
|
|
| (35/2–)
|
|
|-
| 206Tl
| Radium E| style="text-align:right" | 81
| style="text-align:right" | 125
| 205.9761103(15)
| 4.200(17) min
| β−
| 206Pb
| 0−
| Trace
|
|-
| style="text-indent:1em" | 206mTl
|
| colspan="3" style="text-indent:2em" | 2643.11(19) keV
| 3.74(3) min
| IT
| 206Tl
| (12–)
|
|
|-
| 207Tl
| Actinium C
| style="text-align:right" | 81
| style="text-align:right" | 126
| 206.977419(6)
| 4.77(2) min
| β−
| 207Pb
| 1/2+
| Trace
|
|-
| rowspan=2 style="text-indent:1em" | 207mTl
| rowspan=2|
| rowspan=2 colspan="3" style="text-indent:2em" | 1348.1(3) keV
| rowspan=2|1.33(11) s
| IT (99.9%)
| 207Tl
| rowspan=2|11/2–
| rowspan=2|
| rowspan=2|
|-
| β− (.1%)
| 207Pb
|-
| 208Tl
| Thorium C"
| style="text-align:right" | 81
| style="text-align:right" | 127
| 207.9820187(21)
| 3.053(4) min
| β−
| 208Pb
| 5+
| Trace
|
|-
| 209Tl
|
| style="text-align:right" | 81
| style="text-align:right" | 128
| 208.985359(8)
| 2.161(7) min
| β−
| 209Pb
| 1/2+
| Trace
|
|-
| rowspan=2|210Tl
| rowspan=2|Radium C″
| rowspan=2 style="text-align:right" | 81
| rowspan=2 style="text-align:right" | 129
| rowspan=2|209.990074(12)
| rowspan=2|1.30(3) min
| β− (99.991%)
| 210Pb
| rowspan=2|(5+)#
| rowspan=2| Trace
| rowspan=2|
|-
| β−, n (.009%)
| 209Pb
|-
| rowspan=2|211Tl
| rowspan=2|
| rowspan=2 style="text-align:right" | 81
| rowspan=2 style="text-align:right" | 130
| rowspan=2|210.993480(50)
| rowspan=2|80(16) s
| β− (97.8%)
| 211Pb
| rowspan=2|1/2+
| rowspan=2|
| rowspan=2|
|-
| β−, n (2.2%)
| 210Pb
|-
| rowspan=2|212Tl
| rowspan=2|
| rowspan=2 style="text-align:right" | 81
| rowspan=2 style="text-align:right" | 131
| rowspan=2|211.998340(220)#
| rowspan=2|31(8) s
| β− (98.2%)
| 212Pb
| rowspan=2|(5+)
| rowspan=2|
| rowspan=2|
|-
| β−, n (1.8%)
| 211Pb
|-
| rowspan=2|213Tl
| rowspan=2|
| rowspan=2 style="text-align:right" | 81
| rowspan=2 style="text-align:right" | 132
| rowspan=2|213.001915(29)
| rowspan=2|24(4) s
| β− (92.4%)
| 213Pb
| rowspan=2|1/2+
| rowspan=2|
| rowspan=2|
|-
| β−, n (7.6%)
| 212Pb
|-
| rowspan=2|214Tl
| rowspan=2|
| rowspan=2 style="text-align:right" | 81
| rowspan=2 style="text-align:right" | 133
| rowspan=2|214.006940(210)#
| rowspan=2|11(2) s
| β− (66%)
| 214Pb
| rowspan=2|5+#
| rowspan=2|
| rowspan=2|
|-
| β−, n (34%)
| 213Pb
|-
| rowspan=2|215Tl
| rowspan=2|
| rowspan=2 style="text-align:right" | 81
| rowspan=2 style="text-align:right" | 134
| rowspan=2|215.010640(320)#
| rowspan=2|10(4) s
| β− (95.4%)
| 215Pb
| rowspan=2|1/2+#
| rowspan=2|
| rowspan=2|
|-
| β−, n (4.6%)
| 214Pb
|-
| rowspan=2|216Tl
| rowspan=2|
| rowspan=2 style="text-align:right" | 81
| rowspan=2 style="text-align:right" | 135
| rowspan=2|216.015800(320)#
| rowspan=2|6(3) s
| β−
| 216Pb
| rowspan=2|5+#
| rowspan=2|
| rowspan=2|
|-
| β−, n (<11.5%)
| 215Pb

Thallium-201
Thallium-201 (201Tl) is a synthetic radioisotope of thallium. It has a half-life of 73 hours and decays by electron capture, emitting X-rays (~70–80 keV), and photons of 135 and 167 keV in 10% total abundance. Thallium-201 is synthesized by the neutron activation of stable thallium in a nuclear reactor, or by the 203Tl(p, 3n)201Pb nuclear reaction in cyclotrons, as 201Pb naturally decays to 201Tl afterwards. It is a radiopharmaceutical, as it has good imaging characteristics without excessive patient radiation dose. It is the most popular isotope used for thallium nuclear cardiac stress tests.

References

 Isotope masses from:

 Isotopic compositions and standard atomic masses from:

 Half-life, spin, and isomer data selected from the following sources.

 
Thallium
Thallium